Alan Daniel Luque (born 20 February 1999) is an Argentine professional footballer who plays as a defender for Newell's Old Boys.

Career

Club
Luque started with Newell's Old Boys. He was selected on the substitutes bench for Argentine Primera División fixtures with Arsenal de Sarandí and Estudiantes during the 2017–18 campaign, though he didn't make it on to the field on both occasions. Luque's senior debut arrived in August 2018, with manager Omar De Felippe playing him for the full ninety minutes of a Copa Argentina tie with Defensores Unidos of Primera B Metropolitana.

International
Luque has trained with the Argentina U20s in the past, while he was also selected to train against the senior squad during the 2018 FIFA World Cup in Russia.

Career statistics
.

References

External links

1999 births
Living people
People from Reconquista, Santa Fe
Argentine footballers
Association football defenders
Argentine Primera División players
Newell's Old Boys footballers
Sportspeople from Santa Fe Province